The Geddes House is a Georgian Neoclassical style building near Nairn, Scotland.  It was built in 1780 for George Mackintosh and is currently self-catering accommodation.

Footnotes

Houses in Highland (council area)
Neoclassical architecture in Scotland